Torneo Regional was a promotion championship form the second level of the Argentine football league system.

The other league at second level was the Primera B Metropolitana, which is a competition for the numerous clubs in the city of Buenos Aires and the Greater Buenos Aires metropolitan area.

List of champions

See also
Argentine football league system
List of football clubs in Argentina

References

External links
 Argentina - Torneo Regional - Torneo del Interior - Torneo Argentino A

Defunct football leagues in Argentina